K240 is a real-time strategy video game published by Gremlin Graphics and released for the Amiga home computer in 1994. It is a sequel to the 1991 game Utopia: The Creation of a Nation.

Plot

Based in a sector of deep space called K240 in the year 2380, the game involves building space colonies on a cluster of asteroids and mining them for valuable ore, while fighting against several different races of hostile aliens with similar motives.

Reception
The game achieved a review score of 91% in CU Amiga

Legacy
K240 was succeeded by Fragile Allegiance, which is a PC remake of the game with improved graphics and user interface. Many of the buildings, ships, missiles, and game concepts are the same. However, the Human Empire is dissolved in a coup, and united with several alien races in a multiracial Federation. There are also gameplay differences resulting from ships being given limited range as well as espionage.

References

External links
K240 at Lemon Amiga
K240 at Amiga Hall of Light
K240 fan page

1994 video games
Amiga games
Amiga-only games
Real-time strategy video games
Science fiction video games
Video games with isometric graphics
Gremlin Interactive games
Fiction about asteroid mining
Video games scored by Patrick Phelan
Video games set in the 24th century
Video games developed in the United Kingdom